Tilting bolt action is a type of locking mechanism often used in self-loading firearms and, rarely, in straight-pull repeating rifles. Essentially, the design consists of a moving bolt driven by some mechanism, most often a piston with gas pressure from the gas port behind the muzzle.  The bolt drops down into receiver recess and locks on bolt closing.  Tilting the bolt up and down locks-unlocks in the breech. This tilting allows gas pressure in the barrel from firing the gun to lower to safe levels before the cartridge case is ejected.

For handgun design, the tilting barrel as used in the Browning, is a similar operating mechanism. The tilting bolt has lost favor in contemporary firearm design of rifle caliber to locking systems such as the rotating bolt due to reasons such as increased wearing of the surfaces acted on, higher demands on the receiver due to transfer of locking stresses to it (e. g., it can't be made from aluminium or stamped sheet steel) & better potential accuracy of rotating bolt. Yet it is widespread in vintage firearms listed below.

Examples
FN Model 1949, semi-automatic rifle
FN FAL, select-fire battle rifle
SKS, semi-automatic carbine
SVT-40, semi-automatic rifle
Kbsp wz. 1938M, prototype semi-automatic rifle
AS-44, prototype select-fire assault rifle
ZH-29, semi-automatic rifle
vz. 52 rifle, semi-automatic rifle
MAS-49, semi-automatic rifle
PTRS-41, semi-automatic anti-tank rifle
StG 44 & MKb 42(H), select-fire assault rifle
Ag m/42, semi-automatic rifle
ZB vz. 26, light machine gun
Bren light machine gun, light machine gun
Uk vz. 59, general purpose machine gun
M50 Reising, submachine gun; uniquely tilts upwards to lock and uses Delayed Blowback for action.
LS-26, light machine gun; uniquely uses Delayed Blowback for action.
SK-46, prototype semi-automatic rifle
SIG Model U, prototype semi-automatic rifle
CZ-38, prototype semi-automatic rifle

See also
Falling-block action
Rolling block
Break action
Bolt action
Rotating bolt

References

Firearm actions